The 2002 Copa Bolivia was the last Copa Bolivia. Only teams from 2nd division played in the qualifying round. The tournament was replaced in the following year with the Copa Aerosur.

Qualifying round

Play-off Round
 Oruro Royal Withdrawn from the tournament because they were going to celebrate what happened the last year after the plane crashed.

Group stage
Group A

Standings

Results

Group B

Standings

Results

Semi-final

Final

References 

Bol
Bol